Palm Beach County is a county located in the southeastern part of Florida and lies directly north of Broward County and Miami-Dade County. The county had a population of 1,492,191 as of the 2020 census, making it the third-most populous county in the state of Florida and the 26th-most populous county in the United States. The largest city and county seat is West Palm Beach. Named after one of its oldest settlements, Palm Beach, the county was established in 1909, after being split from Dade County. The county's modern-day boundaries were established in 1963.

Palm Beach County is one of the three counties that make up the Miami metropolitan area, also referred to as South Florida or the Tri-County area, which was home to an estimated 6,198,782 people in 2018.

The area had been increasing in population since the late 19th century, with the incorporation of West Palm Beach in 1894 and after Henry Flagler extended the Florida East Coast Railway and built the Royal Poinciana Hotel, The Breakers, and Whitehall. In 1928, the Okeechobee hurricane struck Palm Beach County and caused thousands of deaths. More recently, the county acquired national attention during the 2000 presidential election, when a controversial recount occurred.

As of 2004, Palm Beach County is Florida's wealthiest county, with a per capita personal income of $44,518. It leads the state in agricultural productivity; agriculture is Palm Beach County's second-largest industry, after real estate development. In undeveloped (central and western) Palm Beach County there is significant tropical agricultural production, especially nurseries, truck crops (vegetables), and sugar cane. Palm Beach County has been called the "Winter Vegetable Capital" of the nation.

History

Around 12,000 years ago, Native Americans began migrating into Florida. An estimated 20,000 Native Americans lived in South Florida when the Spanish arrived. Their population diminished significantly by the 18th century, due to warfare, enslavement, and diseases from Europe. In 1513, Juan Ponce de León became the first European in modern-day Palm Beach County when he landed at the Jupiter Inlet. Among the first non-Native American residents were African Americans, many of whom were former slaves or immediate descendants of former slaves, arriving in what was then Spanish Florida in the late 17th century. Finding refuge among the Seminoles, the former slaves or descendants of former slaves fought alongside them against white settlers and bounty hunters during the Seminole Wars. Portions of the Second Seminole War occurred in Palm Beach County, including the Battles of the Loxahatchee in 1838.

The county's oldest surviving structure, the Jupiter Lighthouse, was built in 1860, after receiving authorization to the land from President Franklin Pierce in 1854. During the American Civil War, Florida was a member of the Confederate States of America. Two Confederate adherents removed the lighting mechanism from the lighthouse. One of the men who removed the light, Augustus O. Lang, was also the first white settler in Palm Beach County. He built a palmetto shack along the eastern shore of Lake Worth in 1863 after abandoning the cause of the Confederacy. After the Civil War ended, the Jupiter Lighthouse was relit in 1866.

In October 1873, a hurricane caused a shipwreck between Biscayne Bay and the New River. The crew survived the wreck but nearly died due to starvation because of the desolation of the area. In response, five Houses of Refuge were built along the east coast of Florida from the Fort Pierce Inlet southward to Biscayne Bay. Orange Grove House of Refuge No. 3 was built near Delray Beach in 1876.

Very few people lived in modern-day Palm Beach County prior to the arrival of Henry Flagler, who first visited in the early 1890s. A Standard Oil tycoon, Flagler was instrumental in the county's development around the turn of the century. First, he purchased land on both sides of Lake Worth. Other investors followed suit, causing a small boom and bringing in existing businesses and resulting in the establishment of many new businesses. The Royal Poinciana Hotel, constructed by Flagler and his constructed crews to accommodate wealthy tourists, opened for business in February 1894. About a month later, the Florida East Coast Railway, owned by Flagler, reached West Palm Beach. On November 5, 1894, Palm Beach County's oldest city, West Palm Beach, was incorporated. In 1896, another hotel built by Flagler was opened, the Palm Beach Inn, later renamed The Breakers. He also constructed his own winter home, which he and his wife moved into in 1902. The arrivals of Major Nathan Boynton, Congressman William S. Linton, and railroad surveyor Thomas Rickards in the 1890s also proved important because they developed communities that later became Boynton Beach, Delray Beach, and Boca Raton, respectively.

The Florida Legislature voted to establish Palm Beach County in 1909, carving it out of what was then the northern portion of Dade County and initially including all of Lake Okeechobee. The southernmost part of Palm Beach County was separated to create the northern portion of Broward County in 1915, the northwestern portion became part of Okeechobee County in 1917, and southern Martin County was created from northernmost Palm Beach County in 1925. The boundaries remained the same until 1963, when the Florida Legislature reduced Palm Beach County's share of Lake Okeechobee from about 80 percent to less than 40 percent and divided the lake more equitably among Glades, Hendry, Martin, and Okeechobee counties. A final change to the county's boundaries occurred in 2009, when a small portion of land was given to Broward County.

The 1910s and much of the 1920s brought prosperity and rapid population growth to South Florida, coinciding with the Florida land boom of the 1920s. Many local historic districts and landmarks listed in the National Register of Historic Places in Palm Beach County were designed and constructed during the 1920s, with the main contributors being architects Maurice Fatio, Addison Mizner, Marion Sims Wyeth, and the firm Harvey and Clarke, which included Gustav Maass. Total property value in West Palm Beach skyrocketed from $13.6 million in 1920 to $61 million in 1925, before briefly reaching a pre-Great Depression peak of $89 million in 1929. The city's population quadrupled between 1920 and 1927.

Early on September 17, 1928, the Okeechobee hurricane made landfall near West Palm Beach as a category-4 storm and crossed Lake Okeechobee shortly thereafter. While the hurricane caused catastrophic impact in eastern portions of the county, the Lake Okeechobee region suffered a much heavier loss of life. Wind-driven storm surge in the lake inundated hundreds of square miles, including the nearby communities of Belle Glade, Pahokee, and South Bay. At least 2,500 deaths occurred, many of whom were black migrant farmers. An assessment of impact throughout the county reported 552 businesses destroyed, 1,447 businesses damaged, 3,584 homes destroyed, and 11,409 homes damaged, leaving 4,008 families homeless. However, several cities were excluded, such as Boca Raton, Greenacres, Lantana, and South Palm Beach. Damage in South Florida totaled roughly $25 million. In response to the storm, the Herbert Hoover Dike was constructed to prevent a similar disaster.

As a result of 1926 Miami hurricane and the 1928 storm, Palm Beach County, along with the rest of South Florida, began suffering economic turmoil and pushed the region into the Great Depression, even before the Wall Street Crash of 1929. Housing prices dropped dramatically in the county, with the total real estate value in West Palm Beach falling to $41.6 million in 1930 and then to $18.2 million in 1935. However, the decade also brought an airport to the county. Morrison Field, later renamed the Palm Beach International Airport, opened in 1936.

After the U.S. entered World War II, it was converted to an Air Force Base in 1942. During the war, thousands of servicemen arrived in Palm Beach County for training and supporting the war effort. Following the conclusion of World War II, a number of veterans returned to the area for work, vacation, or retirement. The base was closed and became a commercial airport again in 1962. Migration to the county by workers, tourists, and retirees continued into the 21st century.

On August 28, 1949, a category-4 hurricane struck Lake Worth Beach with maximum sustained winds of 130 mph (215 km/h), causing considerable damage. Throughout Palm Beach County, the hurricane destroyed 65 homes and damaged 13,283 others.

The area's first television station, WIRK-TV Channel 21, began broadcasting on September 13, 1953. It went off the air less than three years later. However, NBC affiliate WPTV-TV and CBS affiliate WPEC first aired in 1954 and 1955, respectively – both of which are still in existence today.

Richard Paul Pavlick nearly attempted to assassinate then President-elect John F. Kennedy while the family vacationed in Palm Beach in December 1960. On December 11, Pavlick forwent his attempt because Kennedy was with his wife, Jacqueline, and their two children. Four days later, Pavlick's car, which had sticks of dynamite inside, was surrounded by police and he was arrested. Charges against Pavolick were dropped on December 2, 1963, 10 days after Kennedy was assassinated in Dallas, Texas. Additionally, a secret blast shelter was built on Peanut Island during his presidency because escalating Cold War tensions.

Hurricane David struck near West Palm Beach late on September 3, 1979, with sustained winds of 100 mph (155 km/h). The storm's winds shattered windows in stores near the coast and caused property damage. A few roofs were torn off, and numerous buildings were flooded from over 6 in (150 mm) of rainfall. Damage in the county reached $30 million, most of which was incurred to agriculture.

The county became the center of controversy during the 2000 presidential election. Allegedly, the "butterfly ballot", designed by Palm Beach County Supervisor of Elections Theresa LePore, led to an unexpectedly large number of votes for Reform Party candidate Pat Buchanan, rather than for Democrat Al Gore. Due to the aforementioned "butterfly ballot" and the closeness of the statewide results between Gore and Texas Governor George W. Bush, the Florida Supreme Court mandated manual recounts in all counties with disputed results. However, the Supreme Court of the United States overturned the decision in Bush v. Gore on December 12, allowing Florida Secretary of the State Katherine Harris to award the 25 electoral votes to Bush, as Harris's tally prior to the state-ordered recounts placed him ahead of Gore by 537 popular votes. In turn, this gave Bush victory in the national election.

Following the September 11 attacks in 2001, a Federal Bureau of Investigation investigation revealed that 12 of the 19 hijackers trained or resided in Palm Beach County during the months prior to the attacks. Later that month, during the anthrax attacks, a letter containing spores of this substance was mailed to the American Media, Inc. building in Boca Raton. Three people were exposed to the anthrax, including Robert Stevens, a photo editor who later died after an infection induced by exposure.

Three hurricanes severely impacted Palm Beach County in 2004 and 2005: Frances, Jeanne, and Wilma. On September 5, 2004, Frances made landfall in Martin County as a category-2 hurricane. Six deaths occurred in the county. Jeanne struck near the same location as a category-3 hurricane on September 26, 2004. About 4,160 homes were damaged and 60 were destroyed. Jeanne left about $260 million in damage in the county. On October 24, 2005, Hurricane Wilma struck Collier County as a category-3 hurricane. The storm moved northeastward, directly crossing Palm Beach County. Several locations reported hurricane-force winds, including a wind gust of 117 mph (188 km/h) in Belle Glade. Over 90% of Florida Power & Light customers lost electricity. Two deaths occurred in Palm Beach County. The storm inflicted some degree of impact to more than 55,000 homes and 3,600 businesses. Palm Beach County suffered about $2.9 billion in damages.

In August 2012, the outer bands of Hurricane Isaac dropped at least  of rain near Lion Country Safari. The consequent flooding left neighborhoods in The Acreage, Loxahatchee, Loxahatchee Groves, Royal Palm Beach, and Wellington stranded for up to several days. As Hurricane Irma approached in September 2017, mandatory or voluntary evacuations were ordered for more than 290,000 residents of Palm Beach County. Impact was generally limited to widespread power outages and damaged trees and vegetation, though  isolated property damage was reported. The storm left about $300 million in damage in the county, as well as five fatalities.

Toponymy

The coconut palm, Cocos nucifera, is not native to Florida (nor anywhere else in the United States). Its presence in what is today Palm Beach County is due to the shipwreck of the Spanish ship Providencia in 1878, near today's Mar-a-Lago. It was traveling from Havana  to Cádiz, Spain with a cargo of coconuts. The shipwreck was within walking distance of the shore—the Florida State Archives conserves a picture of a painting—and a deliberate grounding so as to obtain an insurance payout has been proposed. The coconuts were salvaged, too many to be eaten, and thousands were planted.  A lush grove of palm trees soon grew on what was later named Palm Beach.

Geography

It is the second-largest county in Florida by land area and third-largest by total area. Much of the water is the Atlantic Ocean and Lake Okeechobee. The county has an estimated  of farmland.

The eastern third of Palm Beach County is highly urbanized, while the central and western portions of the county are suburban or rural. Palm Beach County is one of three counties in the Miami metropolitan area. However, the county's western communities along Lake Okeechobee, such as Belle Glade, South Bay, and Pahokee, have also been considered more part of the rural Florida Heartland.

It consists mainly of barrier islands and peninsulas, including Jupiter Island, Singer Island, and Palm Beach Island. These islands are separated from the mainland by the Intracoastal Waterway, with much of the waterway locally known as the Lake Worth Lagoon. The main barrier landmasses are split by four inlets: the Jupiter Inlet, the Lake Worth Inlet, the South Lake Worth Inlet, and the Boca Raton Inlet. Two of the four inlets are natural, but significantly altered – the Jupiter and Boca Raton inlets – while the Lake Worth and South Lake Worth inlets are man-made, with the former dug in the 1890s and the latter created between 1926 and 1927. Several other islands exist within the Intracoastal Waterway, including Hypoluxo Island, Munyon Island, and Peanut Island.

Natural areas
 Arthur R. Marshall Loxahatchee National Wildlife Refuge, a  refuge in Boynton Beach
 DuPuis Management Area, a  area of protected lands
 John D. MacArthur Beach State Park, a  park in North Palm Beach, Florida
 J.W. Corbett Wildlife Management Area, a  area of protected lands
 Jupiter Ridge Natural Area, a  preserve in Jupiter, Florida
 Juno Dunes Natural Area, a  preserve in Juno Beach
 Frenchman's Forest Natural Area, a  preserve in Palm Beach Gardens
 Sweetbay Natural Area, a  preserve in Palm Beach Gardens
 Royal Palm Beach Pines Natural Area, a  preserve in Royal Palm Beach.
 Hypoluxo Scrub Natural Area, a  preserve in Hypoluxo
 Rosemary Scrub Natural Area, a  preserve in Boynton Beach
 Seacrest Scrub Natural Area, a  preserve in Boynton Beach
 Delray Oaks Natural Area a  prairie and xeric hammock preserve with a small strand swamp and areas of flatwoods in Delray Beach
 Leon M. Weekes Environmental Preserve, a  preserve in Delray Beach
 Grassy Waters Everglades Preserve, a  wetland in West Palm Beach, Florida
In addition, the county has an abundance of coral reef patches along its coastline and has made efforts to preserve them.

Demographics

2020 census 

As of the 2020 United States census, there were 1,492,191 people, 568,915 households, and 354,512 families residing in the county.

2010 census 
Of 664,594 households, 24.35% had children under the age of 18 living with them, 46.28% were married couples living together, 11.68% had a female householder with no husband present, and 37.40% were not families. Around 30.11% of all households were made up of individuals, and 14.70% (4.02% male and 10.68% female) had someone living alone who was 65 years of age or older. The average household size was 2.39 and the average family size was 2.97.

The age distribution was 20.4% under the age of 18, 8.0% from 18 to 24, 23.7% from 25 to 44, 26.4% from 45 to 64, and 21.6% who were 65 years of age or older. The median age was 43.5 years. For every 100 females, there were 93.8 males. For every 100 females age 18 and over, there were 91.3 males.

Ethnicity 
U.S. Census Bureau 2010 ethnic/race demographics:
 White (73.5% when including White Hispanics) White (non-Hispanic): 60.1% (10.8% German, 10.2% Irish, 9.4% Italian, 7.4% English, 4.7% Polish, 4.7% Russian, 2.4% French, 1.6% Scottish, 1.1% Scotch-Irish, 1.0% Dutch, 1.0% Hungarian, 0.8% Swedish, 0.7% Greek, 0.6% Norwegian, 0.6% French Canadian)
 Hispanic or Latino of any race: 19.0% (3.7% Mexican, 3.3% Cuban, 3.0% Puerto Rican, 1.7% Colombian, 1.5% Guatemalan, 0.8% Dominican, 0.6% Honduran, 0.6% Peruvian, 0.5% Salvadoran)
 Black (non-Hispanic) (17.3% when including Black Hispanics): 16.8% (7.2% West Indian/Afro-Caribbean American [4.6% Haitian, 1.8% Jamaican, 0.2% Bahamian, 0.2% Other or Unspecified West Indian, 0.2% Trinidadian and Tobagonian, 0.1% British West Indian (from colonies in the Caribbean), and 0.8% Subsaharan African)
 Asian: 2.4% (0.7% Asian Indian, 0.4% Chinese, 0.4% Other Asian, 0.3% Filipino, 0.3% Vietnamese, 0.1% Korean, 0.1% Japanese)
 Two or more races: 2.3%
 American Indian and Alaska Native: 0.5%
 Native Hawaiian and Other Pacific Islander: 0.1%
 Other races: 4.0% (0.5% Arab)

In 2010, 4.5% of the population considered themselves to be of only "American" ancestry (regardless of race or ethnicity).

As of 2010, Haitians made up the largest population of immigrants, with Cuban exiled refugees second, Mexicans  third, followed by Colombians  fourth, then Jamaicans, Guatemalans, Canadians, Hondurans, ninth being Peruvians, and Brazilians being the tenth-highest group of expatriates. British, Germans, and Polish, which had held spots in Palm Beach County's top-10 immigrant list of 2000, dropped off the 2010 list, which now no longer has any European countries in its top 10.

In 2010, 22.3% of the county's population was foreign born, with 43.7% being naturalized American citizens. Of foreign-born residents, 71.3% were born in Latin America, 13.6% were born in Europe, 9.2% born in Asia, 4.0% in North America, 1.8% born in Africa, and 0.1% were born in Oceania.

Language 
As of 2010, 73.13% of all residents spoke English as a primary language, while 15.69% spoke Spanish, 4.03% French Creole (mainly Haitian Creole), 1.06% French, 0.94% Portuguese, and 0.54% of the population spoke Italian.

Economy

Companies headquartered in Palm Beach County include Office Depot, The ADT Corporation, TBC Corporation, G4S Secure Solutions, NextEra Energy, The GEO Group, Globalsat Group, and Bluegreen Vacations.

There are a significant number of aerospace-focused facilities operating in the county. Although not headquartered in Palm Beach County, aerospace companies with facilities located within the county include United Technologies, Pratt & Whitney Rocketdyne, Sikorsky Aircraft, General Dynamics, Lockheed Martin, and B/E Aerospace. Many of these companies rank among the top 100 employers for the county. The largest employer in Palm Beach County is The School District of Palm Beach County, with 27,168 employees, including more than 12,800 teachers.

Previously W. R. Grace and Company had its headquarters in unincorporated Palm Beach County, near Boca Raton. Prior to its closing, the Boca Raton headquarters had about 130 employees. On January 27, 2011, it announced it was closing the Boca headquarters and moving its administrative staff out of state along with some employees.

Previously, American Media, publisher of the National Enquirer, was headquartered in the Boca Raton. It still maintains an office there, but moved the National Enquirer to New York in 2014.

Males had a median income of $44,324 versus $37,337 for females. The per capita income for the county was $33,610. About 8.6% of families and 12.2% of the population were below the poverty line, including 18.5% of those under age 18 and 7.7% of those aged 65 or over.

Culture

Sports
The St. Louis Cardinals and the Miami Marlins conduct their spring training at Roger Dean Stadium in Jupiter.  Two teams in the Class A-Advanced Florida State League also play their home games at Roger Dean Stadium: the Jupiter Hammerheads, an affiliate of the Miami Marlins, and the Palm Beach Cardinals, an affiliate of the St. Louis Cardinals.

The Ballpark of the Palm Beaches, opened in February 2017 in West Palm Beach, accommodates both the Washington Nationals and the Houston Astros for spring training.

Prior to the construction of Roger Dean Stadium, the Montreal Expos and Atlanta Braves held their spring training at Municipal Stadium in West Palm Beach. The West Palm Beach Expos, a Single-A affiliate of the Montreal Expos, also played their games there.

Also popular are the Florida Atlantic Owls, an NCAA Division I school that participates in Conference USA. The FAU football team plays at FAU Stadium, and averaged 17,941 fans during the 2017 season. The FAU basketball team plays at FAU Arena, and averaged 1,346 fans during the 2013–14 season.

The Palm Beach Imperials are an American Basketball Association 2006 expansion franchise.

Tourism
Tourists can visit these attractions and annual events:
 South Florida Fair
 SunFest
 Boat Show
 Winter Equestrian Festival
 Lion Country Safari
 Rapids Water Park
 Kravis Center for the Performing Arts
 South Florida Science Museum
 Palm Beach Zoo at Dreher Park
 Norton Museum of Art
 Flagler Museum
 Jupiter Inlet Lighthouse
 Worth Avenue
 Clematis Street Historic Commercial District
 Rosemary Square
 Peanut Island
 Society of the Four Arts
 Ann Norton Sculpture Gardens
 McCarthy's Wildlife Sanctuary
 Mounts Botanical Garden
 Gumbo Limbo Environmental Complex
 Morikami Museum and Japanese Gardens, including the Roji-en Japanese Gardens
 Palm Beach Maritime Museum
 Sandoway Discovery Center
 Daggerwing Nature Center 

A number of shopping malls exist throughout Palm Beach County, including the Palm Beach Outlets, Rosemary Square (formerly CityPlace), Boynton Beach Mall, The Gardens Mall, Town Center at Boca Raton, The Mall at Wellington Green and Mizner Park. Formerly, the Palm Beach and Cross County Malls operated in the county, though they closed in 1997 and 2010, respectively.

Media
 The Palm Beach Post
 Palm Beach Daily News
 New Times Broward-Palm Beach
 Sun-Sentinel
 WPTV-TV
 WPBF-TV
 WFLX
 WPEC
 WTVX

Government
The Florida Department of Corrections operates the Glades Correctional Institution in an unincorporated area in Palm Beach County near Belle Glade.

Palm Beach County's revenue from property taxes, sales taxes and tourist development taxes reached record levels in Fiscal Year (FY) 2018, according to the Clerk of the Circuit Court & Comptroller, Palm Beach County’s annual financial report, Checks & Balances: Your Guide to County Finances.  

The County collected $1.1 billion in property tax revenue in FY 2018, an increase of 6 percent over the previous year. Sales tax collections rose to $175.8 million, marking the eighth consecutive year of growth. Revenue from Tourist Development Tax receipts was $53.8 million, up from $48.5 million in FY 2017. Meanwhile, Local Option Gas Taxes paid by motorists for gasoline decreased for the first time in five years, partially due to higher gasoline prices, which reduced the number of miles driven, according to the Clerk of the Circuit Court & Comptroller's Checks & Balances report.

County government
The county is governed by a board of commissioners, consisting of seven commissioners, who are all elected from single-member districts. One of the commissioners is elected County Mayor and one of them is elected Vice Mayor. Commissioners serve staggered terms, and commissioners from Districts 1, 3, 5, and 7 are elected during presidential election years, while the commissioners from Districts 2, 4, and 6 are elected in gubernatorial election years.

Elected county officers include a clerk of courts and comptroller, sheriff, property appraiser, tax collector, and supervisor of elections. State officers serving the Florida judicial district include the state attorney and public defender. All positions are 4-year terms, requiring direct election by voters in presidential election years.

Five former county commissioners have been accused or found guilty of corruption from 2006 to 2009. A grand jury recommended a strong inspector general. This position was approved by county voters in 2010. A county judge found that the mandate covered municipal government in 2015.

{| class=wikitable
|-
! colspan = 3 | Palm Beach County elected officials
|-
! colspan = 3 | Board of County Commissioners
|-
!Position
!Incumbent
|-
| |District 1 Commissioner
| align="center"|Maria G. Marino
|-
| |District 2 Commissioner
| align="center"|Mayor Gregg Weiss
|-
| |District 3 Commissioner
| align="center"|Michael Barnett
|-
| |District 4 Commissioner
| align="center"|Marci Woodward|-
| |District 5 Commissioner
| align="center"|Vice Mayor Maria Sachs
|-
| |District 6 Commissioner
| align="center"|Sara Baxter
|-
| |District 7 Commissioner
| align="center"|Mack Bernard
|-
| |County Administrator
| align="center"|Verdenia Baker
|-
! colspan = 3 | Constitutional Officers
|-
!Position
!Incumbent
|-
| |Sheriff
| align="center"|Ric Bradshaw
|-
| |State Attorney
| align="center"|Dave Aronberg
|-
| |Public Defender
| align="center"|Carey Haughwout
|-
| |Property Appraiser
| align="center"|Dorothy Jacks
|-
| |Tax Collector
| align="center"|Anne M. Gannon
|-
| |Clerk of the Circuit Court and Comptroller
| align="center"|Joseph Abruzzo
|-
| |Supervisor of Elections
| align="center"|Wendy Sartory Link
|-
| |Judiciary
| align="center"|Krista Marx
|-
! colspan = 3 | School Board
|-
!Position
!Incumbent
|-
| |District 1
| align="center"|Barbara McQuinn
|-
| |District 2
| align="center"|Alexandria Ayala
|-
| |District 3
| align="center"|Karen Brill
|-
| |District 4
| align="center"|Erica Whitfield
|-
| |District 5
| align="center"|Frank Barbieri
|-
| |District 6
| align="center"|Marcia Andrews
|-
| |District 7
| align="center"|Edwin Ferguson
|-
| |Superintendent
| align="center"|Michael Burke
|-
| |Student Representative
| align="center"|Logan Harrington

|}

Law enforcement

The Palm Beach County Sheriff's Office (PBSO) provides police services to the county's unincorporated areas and the 13 municipalities covered by PBSO. PBSO also oversees the county jail system, provides security at all four of the county courthouses, and is the primary law enforcement agency covering Palm Beach International Airport. The Sheriff's Office is composed of roughly 4,200 employees, including approximately 1,600 sworn law enforcement personnel, 700 sworn corrections personnel, 1,900 civilian personnel and 1,800 volunteers. The annual operating budget for the PBSO is approximately $740,000,000.   Ric L. Bradshaw has been sheriff for Palm Beach County since January 2005, and has served over 45 years in law enforcement.

There are two jail facilities operated by the Palm Beach County Sheriff's Office. One is in Belle Glade, called the West Detention Center, which houses all custody levels from minimum to maximum security.  At any one time it can contain up to 991 inmates (total bed capacity), with a staff of 188. The facility has a video visitation program which allows families to communicate with inmates remotely. The largest jail is the Main Detention Center. Three towers make up the center, The South Tower, The East Tower, and The West Tower. The largest is The South Tower, the building was constructed in 1993 from concrete and steel with a cost of $52 million. The East and West Towers were built in 1983; they now flank the South Tower, completing the Main Detention Center. The Main Detention Center's primary function is to hold high risk inmates, federal inmates, and those inmates who are in need of special medical attention and/or are unable to operate at other facilities. The total number of beds at the facility is 2,166. The South Tower can hold 1,285 inmates, East Tower has 418 beds, and The West Tower has 404 beds.

Since the founding of Palm Beach County in 1909, 16 people have served as county sheriff.

Federal and state representation 
In the United States House of Representatives, Palm Beach County is represented by three Democrats and one Republican: Brian Mast of the 18th district, Sheila Cherfillus-McCormick of the 20th district, Ted Deutch of the 21st district, and Lois Frankel of the 22nd district.

Nine districts of the Florida House of Representatives represent parts of Palm Beach County, with the seats held by Kelly Skidmore (D) of 81st district, John Snyder (R) of the 82nd district, Rick Roth (R) of the 85th district, Matt Willhite (D) of the 86th district, David Silvers (D) of the 87th district, Omari Hardy (D) of the 88th district, Mike Caruso (R) of the 89th district, Joseph Casello (D) of the 90th district, and Emily Slosberg (D) of the 91st district. Additionally, the county has four seats in the Florida Senate, which are represented by Gayle Harrell (R) of the 25th district, Tina Polsky (D) of the 29th district, Bobby Powell (D) of the 30th district, and Lori Berman of the 31st district.

 Politics 
As of 2023, the county has a strong Democratic plurality, with large Republican and independent minorities, respectively. In gubernatorial races, the county had been a stronghold for Democrats, a trend that began in 1990 and continued up until 2022, when Republican Ron DeSantis won a majority of the vote in the county.

Consequently, Palm Beach County has supported the Democratic Party nominee for the presidency since 1992, though the county had been carried by the Republican Party nominee for every election from 1948 to 1988. Republicans have been gaining an increased share of the votes in Palm Beach County since 2000, however. That year, Al Gore defeated George W. Bush in the county by a margin of approximately 27 percent, while Joe Biden defeated Donald Trump (who is a resident of the county) by just 13 percent in 2020. 

Transportation

Roadways
An advocacy group has criticized
Palm Beach County's roadways for being dangerous for non-motorized users. Local municipalities are working to increase safety, but county and state authorities have been hesitant to modify designs.

Expressways
  Interstate 95
  Florida's Turnpike

I-95 and Florida's Turnpike are controlled-access expressways that serve Palm Beach county. Southern Boulevard (signed SR 80/US 98), which runs east–west through central Palm Beach County, is a partial freeway from Interstate 95 in West Palm Beach to US 441/SR 7 in Wellington and Royal Palm Beach. In the late 1980s, there were plans to construct two additional expressways in Palm Beach County. One was to be an  toll freeway from Royal Palm Beach to downtown West Palm Beach. It would have run between Belvedere Road and Okeechobee Boulevard; necessitating the destruction of several homes and churches along its path. The other proposed route was a northern extension of the Sawgrass Expressway which was to be called "University Parkway". The University Parkway would have snaked around suburban developments west of Boca Raton, Delray Beach, and Boynton Beach; its path bordering the Loxahatchee National Wildlife Refuge. Ultimately, both expressways were canceled due to opposition from county residents.

Major highways
 
 Jog Road
 
 
 
 
 
 

Railroads

 Tri-Rail runs along eastern Palm Beach County, adjacent to Interstate 95 for most of its length. It has stops in Boca Raton, Delray Beach, Boynton Beach, Lake Worth Beach, West Palm Beach, and Mangonia Park.

The national intercity train system, Amtrak, offers the Silver Meteor and the Silver Star'' in West Palm Beach and Delray Beach.
 Brightline connects Palm Beach County to its southward neighboring counties of Broward and Dade via their station located in downtown West Palm Beach, with stops in both Fort Lauderdale and Miami.

Airports

 Palm Beach International Airport
 Palm Beach County Park Airport
 North Palm Beach County General Aviation Airport
 Boca Raton Airport
 Palm Beach County Glades Airport

Public transit
 PalmTran provides bus service throughout Palm Beach county.

Seaport
The Port of Palm Beach is located in Riviera Beach, where Celebration Cruise Line operates 2-day cruises to the Bahamas.

Trails
The Lake Okeechobee Scenic Trail, a segment of the Florida National Scenic Trail, passes through the county.

Education

Primary and secondary schools
All of Palm Beach County is served by the School District of Palm Beach County. As of 2006, it was the fourth largest school district in Florida and the 11th largest school district in the United States. As of August 2006, the district operated 164 schools, including 25 high schools, and, as of July 22, 2006, had an additional 33 charter schools, with seven more scheduled to open in August 2006. Newsweek listed three Palm Beach County high schools in the top 50 schools in the list 1200 Top U.S. Schools - Atlantic Community High School, Suncoast High School and the Alexander Dreyfoos School of the Arts, all public magnet schools. Private schools in the county include American Heritage School, Cardinal Newman High School, Jupiter Christian School, The King's Academy, The Benjamin School, Oxbridge Academy, Palm Beach Day Academy, Pope John Paul II High School, St Andrew's School and Weinbaum Yeshiva High School.

Colleges and universities
 Florida Atlantic University
Florida International University
 Lynn University
 Nova Southeastern University
 South University
 Palm Beach Atlantic University
 Palm Beach State College
 Keiser University
 Roosevelt Junior College (closed)
 Southeastern College

Public libraries
Palm Beach County is served by the Palm Beach County Library System, established in 1967 through a Special Act of the Florida Legislature, and operates as a department of county government. It is currently made up of 17 library branches, as well as a bookmobile which travels to more than 40 stops each month. As Palm Beach County continues to see population growth, the library system will also need to plan for continued expansion. Presently, the county plans to build a new 30,000-square-foot branch in the Canyon Town Center, located in western Boynton Beach. This new branch is projected to be completed in 2021. The system's Main Library is located on Summit Boulevard in an unincorporated section of West Palm Beach. It is the largest provider of library services in the county, serving an area that is comparable to the size of the state of Delaware, with holdings of over 1.88 million items.

Unlike many county library systems, including neighboring Broward and Miami-Dade counties, several municipalities continue to operate their own libraries. The county library systems works together in a cooperative system model which allows interoperation between the county system and the 13 city libraries in Boca Raton, Boynton Beach, Delray Beach, Highland Beach, Lake Park, Lake Worth Beach, Lantana, Manalapan (J. Turner Moore Public Library), North Palm Beach, Palm Springs, Palm Beach (Society of the Four Arts), Riviera Beach, and West Palm Beach (Mandel Public Library of West Palm Beach).

The county's first library began as a Free Reading Room in 1895 in West Palm Beach's first church, the Union Congregational Church, when Reverend Asbury Caldwell began collecting books for a reading club he hoped would keep construction workers out of the city's many drinking establishments located along First Street, or “Thirst Street” as it was known. The reading club floundered when Caldwell left West Palm Beach, but in 1899, the West Palm Beach Public Library got its official start, housed in a two-story former Palm Beach Yacht Club building donated by Commodore Charles John Clarke, a Palm Beach yachtsman, with the collection of books from the Reading Room and a $100 donation from Henry Flagler. A permanent building was constructed in 1924 in Flagler Park along the Intracoastal Waterway. Two additional buildings have also housed the library – one at 100 Clematis Street, a state-of-art building complete with a 250-seat auditorium that opened to much fanfare in 1964. The second, located at 411 Clematis Street, is a four-story building in the West Palm Beach City Center complex, which houses both city hall and the library, is two and one-half times the size of the previous building. In 2012, the West Palm Beach Public Library Foundation formally changed its name to the Mandel Public Library of West Palm Beach after receiving a $5 million grant from the Mandel Foundation.

Communities

The largest city and county seat is West Palm Beach, with a population of 117,415 as of the 2020 US Census. Boca Raton, is the southernmost and second-largest, bordering Broward County and having 97,422 people in 2020 within its city limits. Boynton Beach (between Boca Raton and West Palm Beach), is the third-largest city, with a 2020 population nearing 80,380 residents.

The county has 39 municipalities in total. The municipalities are numbered corresponding to the attached image, except for the newest municipality, Westlake. Municipality populations are based on the 2020 Census.

Golfview was an incorporated town in Palm Beach County from 1936 until 1997.

Census-designated places

 Acacia Villas
 Cabana Colony
 Canal Point (bb)
 Gun Club Estates (m)
 Juno Ridge (z)
 Jupiter Farms
 Kenwood Estates
 Lake Belvedere Estates (o)
 Lake Harbor (p)
 Limestone Creek (y)
 Pine Air
 Plantation Mobile Home Park (s)
 Royal Palm Estates (n)
 San Castle
 Schall Circle (v)
 Seminole Manor (j)
 Stacey Street (q)
 The Acreage
 Watergate
 Westgate (t)

Former census-designated places
Several unincorporated parts of Palm Beach County were listed as census-designated places for the 2000 census, but were not listed for the 2010 census:

 Belle Glade Camp (l)
 Boca Del Mar (c)
 Boca Pointe (a)
 Cypress Lakes (w)
 Dunes Road (cc)
 Fremd Village-Padgett Island (aa)
 Golden Lakes (r)
 Hamptons at Boca Raton (e)
 High Point (i)
 Kings Point (g)
 Lakewood Gardens
 Lake Worth Corridor (k)
 Lakeside Green (x)
 Mission Bay (d)
 Sandalfoot Cove (b)
 Villages of Oriole (h)
 Whisper Walk (f)

Adjacent counties
Palm Beach County borders Martin County to the north, the Atlantic Ocean to the east, Broward County to the south, Hendry County to the west, and extends into Lake Okeechobee in the northwest, where it borders Okeechobee County and Glades County at one point in the center of the lake.

Other unincorporated area
 Century Village (u)

Former communities
 Apix
 Bean City
 Bryant
 Chosen
 Fruitcrest
 Gardena
 Geerworth
 Gladecrest
 Kreamer Island
 Okeelanta
 Sand Cut
 Venus
 Yamato Colony

See also
 National Register of Historic Places listings in Palm Beach County, Florida

References

External links

Government links/Constitutional offices
 Palm Beach County Government / Board of County Commissioners official website
 Palm Beach County Supervisor of Elections
 Palm Beach County Property Appraiser
 Palm Beach County Tax Collector
 Palm Beach County Sheriff's Office
 Clerk & Comptroller, Palm Beach County

Special districts
 Palm Beach County School District
 Soil and Water Conservation District
 South Florida Water Management

Emergency services
 Palm Beach County Sheriff's Office
 Palm Beach County Fire-Rescue

Judicial branch
 Palm Beach County Public Defender
 Palm Beach County State Attorney's Office, 15th Judicial Circuit
 15th Judicial Circuit of Florida

Tourism links
 Palm Beach County Convention and Visitors Bureau
 Chamber of Commerce of the Palm Beaches

 
1909 establishments in Florida
Charter counties in Florida
Counties in the Miami metropolitan area
Populated places established in 1909